The Richmond Kickers are an American professional soccer club based in Richmond, Virginia that compete in the USL Professional Division (USL Pro), the third division in the United States. Founded in 1993, the club has had several spells in the second, third and fourth tiers of American soccer. Since 2006, the club has played in whichever league has represented the third division in American soccer.

The Kickers have reached eight league championships in their existence, winning three total; two in the third division and one in the fourth division. In 2005, the Kickers lost to the Seattle Sounders in the USL First Division championship, to determine the second division champion that season, making it the strongest season performance in club history. The Kickers have won the U.S. Open Cup once in their history, winning the 1995 edition of the tournament. Their next best Open Cup performance was in 2011, when the Kickers reached the semifinals of the tournament, defeating two MLS sides in the process.

The following is a list of each season completed by the Kickers, inclusive of all competitive competitions.

Key
Key to competitions

 USL League One (USL L1) – The third division of soccer in the United States, established in 2019.
 USL Championship (USLC) – The second division of soccer in the United States, established in 2010 and previously known as USL and USL Pro. The Championship was the third division of American soccer from its founding until its elevation to second division status in 2017.
 USL First Division (USL-1) – The second division of soccer in the United States from 2005 through 2009.
 USL Second Division (USL-2) – The third division of soccer in the United States from 2005 through 2009.
 A-League – The second division of soccer in the United States from 1995 through 2004, now defunct.
 American Professional Soccer League (APSL) – The second division of soccer in the United States from 1990 through 1996, now defunct.
 USL Select League (USISL) – The third division of soccer in the United States from 1989 through 1997, now defunct.
 U.S. Open Cup (USOC) – The premier knockout cup competition in US soccer, first contested in 1914.
 CONCACAF Champions League (CCL) – The premier competition in North American soccer since 1962. It went by the name of Champions' Cup until 2008.

Key to colors and symbols

Key to league record
 Season = The year and article of the season
 Div = Level on pyramid
 League = League name
 Pld = Played
 W = Games won
 L = Games lost
 D = Games drawn
 GF = Goals scored
 GA = Goals against
 Pts = Points
 PPG = Points per game
 Conf = Conference position
 Overall = League position

Key to cup record
 DNE = Did not enter
 DNQ = Did not qualify
 NH = Competition not held or canceled
 QR = Qualifying round
 PR = Preliminary round
 GS = Group stage
 R1 = First round
 R2 = Second round
 R3 = Third round
 R4 = Fourth round
 R5 = Fifth round
 QF = Quarterfinals
 SF = Semifinals
 RU = Runners-up
 W = Winners

Seasons 

1. Avg. attendance include statistics from league matches only.
2. Top goalscorer(s) includes all goals scored in league play, playoffs, U.S. Open Cup, and other competitive matches.
3. Points and PPG have been adjusted from non-traditional to traditional scoring systems for seasons prior to 2003 to more effectively compare historical team performance across seasons.

References

External links

 
Richmond Kickers
Richmond Kickers seasons